The National Finals Rodeo (NFR) is the premier rodeo event by the Professional Rodeo Cowboys Association (PRCA). The NFR showcases the talents of the PRCA's top 15 money-winners in the season for each event.

The NFR is held each year in the first full week of December, at the Thomas & Mack Center on the campus of the University of Nevada, Las Vegas in Paradise, Nevada, United States.  (UNLV) and is aired live on The Cowboy Channel. Cowboy Christmas, a cowboy gift show, is held concurrent with the rodeo at the Las Vegas Convention Center.

Since the rodeo uses 'special dirt', the dirt is stored on the UNLV campus for use in the next NFR.

Events
The NFR is the final rodeo event of the PRCA season. World championship titles are awarded to the individuals who earn the most money in his or her event throughout the year. 

7 events and 9 championships are sanctioned by the PRCA:
 Bareback Riding - a rider has to stay on a bucking horse and is only allowed to hang on with a "rigging" attached by a cinch and latigos. The rider must stay on the horse for 8 seconds to be considered a successful ride. Each successful ride is then judged for a maximum score of 100 points. The more difficult the horse is to ride and the more control the cowboy has during the ride, the higher the score. The cowboy with the highest score wins.
Steer Wrestling - Also known as "Bulldogging," is a rodeo event where the rider jumps off his horse onto a Corriente steer and 'wrestles' it to the ground by grabbing it by the horns. The contestant that wrestles the steer to the ground the fastest wins. This is probably the single most physically dangerous event in rodeo for the cowboy, who runs a high risk of jumping off a running horse head first and missing the steer, or of having the thrown steer land on top of him, sometimes horns first.
Team Roping - also called "heading and heeling," is the only team rodeo event. Two ropers capture and restrain a full-grown steer. One horse and rider, the "header," lassos a running steer's horns, while the other horse and rider, the "heeler," lassos the steer's two hind legs. Once the animal is captured, the riders face each other and lightly pull the steer between them, so that both ropes are taut. The team that ropes their steer the fastest wins. This technique originated from methods of capture and restraint for treatment used on a ranch.
 Saddle Bronc Riding - similar to bareback riding, but the rider uses a specialized western saddle without a horn (for safety) as well as a bronc rein and has to stay on the bucking horse for 8 seconds. Like bareback riding, each successful ride is then judged for a maximum score of 100 points. The more difficult the horse is to ride and the more control the cowboy has during the ride, the higher the score. The cowboy with the highest score wins. 
Tie-Down Roping -  also called calf roping, is based on ranch work in which calves are roped for branding, medical treatment, or other purposes. It is the oldest of rodeo's timed events. The cowboy ropes a running calf around the neck with a lariat, and his horse stops and sets back on the rope while the cowboy dismounts, runs to the calf, throws it to the ground and ties three feet together. (If the calf falls when roped, the cowboy must lose time waiting for the calf to get back to its feet so that the cowboy can do the work.) The job of the horse is to hold the calf steady on the rope. The contestant that ropes his calf the fastest wins. A well-trained calf-roping horse will slowly back up while the cowboy ties the calf, to help keep the lariat snug.
Barrel Racing - is a timed speed and agility event. In barrel racing, horse and rider gallop around a cloverleaf pattern of barrels, making agile turns without knocking the barrels over. In professional, collegiate and high school rodeo, barrel racing is an exclusively women's sport, though men and boys occasionally compete at local O-Mok-See competition. Barrel racing takes place with other PRCA sanctioned events, but it is sanctioned by the Women's Professional Rodeo Association (WPRA). Results are shown on that web site. The contestant that successfully passes the cloverleaf pattern the fastest wins. 
Bull Riding -  an event where cowboys attempt ride full-grown bucking bulls for eight seconds. Like the bucking horse events, each successful ride is then judged for a maximum score of 100 points. The more difficult the bull is to ride and the more control the cowboy has during the ride, the higher the score. The cowboy with the highest score wins. Although skills and equipment similar to those needed for bareback bronc riding are required, the event differs considerably from horse riding competition due to the danger involved. Because bulls are unpredictable and may attack a fallen rider, rodeo clowns, now known as "bullfighters", work during bull-riding competition to distract the bulls and help prevent injury to competitors. 
All-Around - The All-Around Cowboy is actually an award, not an event. It is awarded to the highest money winner in two or more events.
The All-Around world title is awarded at the end of the NFR to the highest-earning cowboy who has regularly competed in more than one event during the year. In addition to world championships, an average winner is crowned in each event.

Note: Steer roping is publicized separately and its finals are held separately at the National Finals Steer Roping (NFSR). The National Finals Breakaway Roping (NFBR), held in conjunction with the NFR since 2020, has been held to determine the WPRA’s world champion breakaway roper. 

Since the NFR is extremely popular, it sells out all seats for all of the events. Many casinos carry the events live in their sports books or host special parties to accommodate all of the fans in town who can not get tickets for the events. Most of the major hotels and casinos book special entertainment into their showrooms with a country theme offering many of the regular shows an extended break.

Format and prize structure
The NFR consists of ten days, each of which has a competition, or "go-round", in each event with its own prizes. In addition, each event has a separate set of prizes for having the best combined results over the ten days, referred to as "the average."

The payouts are based on the total prize pool. For every $208,000 in the prize pool, the top six in each go-round receive $620, $490, $370, $260, $160, and $100, and the top eight in the average receive $1590, $1290, $1020, $750, $540, $390, $270, and $150.

In 2012, the prize pool was $6,125,000, so each go-round paid $18,257 for first, $14,429 for second, $10,895 for third, $7656 for fourth, $4712 for fifth, and $2945 for sixth, and each event's average paid $46,821 for first, $37,987 for second, $30,036 for third, $22,085 for fourth, $15,901 for fifth, $11,484 for sixth, $7951 for seventh, and $4417 for eighth.

History
The National Finals Rodeo (NFR), known popularly as the "Super Bowl of rodeo," is a championship event held annually by the Professional Rodeo Cowboys Association (PRCA). Said organization, founded in 1936 as the Cowboys’ Turtle Association, then renamed the Rodeo Cowboys Association in 1945, and known as the Professional Rodeo Cowboys Association since 1975, established the NFR in order to determine the world champion in each of rodeo's seven main events. Bareback riding, steer wrestling, saddle bronc riding, tie-down roping, and bull riding have all been a part of the NFR since the first one in 1959. Team roping was added in 1962, and barrel racing was added in 1967. The NFR showcases the talents of the PRCA's top fifteen money-winners in each event as they compete for the world title. From 1981 to 2000, the NFR also had American freestyle bullfighting, where the top six bullfighters from the Wrangler Bullfighting Tour competed at the event after a year of competing at numerous regular-season events for the chance to qualify for the NFR and try to win the bullfighting world championship. The Wrangler Bullfighting Tour was discontinued after 2000, and freestyle bullfighting became largely obscured for several years, until being heavily revived in the 2010s. Today, freestyle bullfighting has its own organizations that specialize in the event and world championships are determined there. The world championship steer roping competition, the National Finals Steer Roping (NFSR), also held since 1959, has always been held separately from the regular NFR. The NFSR has been held at the Kansas Star Arena in Mulvane, Kansas since 2014. The National Finals Breakaway Roping (NFBR) has been held since 2020 to determine the Women’s Professional Rodeo Association’s world champion breakaway roper. The event is held in conjunction with the NFR.

The inaugural NFR was held in 1959 in Dallas, Texas at the Texas State Fair Coliseum and continued at that venue through 1961. From 1962 to 1964, Los Angeles, California’s Los Angeles Sports Arena hosted the competition. Oklahoma City, Oklahoma successfully bid in 1964 to be the host city. In 1965, the first NFR at the State Fair Arena drew 47,027 fans. The NFR remained there through 1978. From 1979 to 1984, the NFR took place at Oklahoma City’s Myriad Convention Center, bringing state merchants an estimated annual revenue of $8 million.

In 1984, Las Vegas bid for the event. Although the Oklahoma City Council considered building a new $30 million arena at the State Fairgrounds, the Las Vegas bid won. Since 1985, the NFR has been held at the Thomas & Mack Center in Las Vegas, Nevada. The NFR has become Thomas & Mack Center arena's biggest client, bringing in more than 170,000 fans during the 10-day event.

The NFR has had a different number of rounds throughout its history. From 1959 to 1960, there were ten rounds; from 1961 to 1966, there were eight rounds; from 1967 to 1969, there were nine rounds; from 1970 to 1977, the event went back to ten rounds; in 1978, there were eleven rounds; and in 1979, the NFR reverted back to having ten rounds, which has been consistent since then. 

In 2001, a landmark sponsorship agreement was achieved and VF Corporation's Wrangler brand became the first title sponsor of the National Finals Rodeo. The agreement, part of the Professional Rodeo Cowboys Association's continuing effort to elevate professional rodeo to a new level, was made by PRCA Commissioner Steven J. Hatchell.

Oklahoma has bid to return the NFR to Oklahoma City, but is always outbid by the deep pockets of Las Vegas. Starting in 2011, Oklahoma City hosted the National Circuit Finals Rodeo (NCFR), which is the Finals for the PRCA's semi-pro series. This was seen as a step towards proving the crowds exist to bring the NFR back to Oklahoma City when Las Vegas' contract was scheduled to end in 2014.  Following the completion of the 2013 rodeo, Dallas, Texas and Kissimmee, Florida made bids to become the host city starting in 2015.  On January 24, 2014 the PRCA signed a contract extension through 2024 with the Las Vegas Convention and Visitors Authority. However, because the Dallas area hosted in 2020 as a result of Nevada state restrictions, the contract extension was moved to 2025.

Due to the COVID-19 pandemic and Nevada's state mandated health restrictions, the 2020 National Finals Rodeo returned to the Dallas-Fort Worth Metroplex for the first time since 1961 at Globe Life Field in Arlington, Texas, where the state's health restrictions were less onerous. The inaugural National Finals Breakaway Roping (NFBR) was also held at Globe Life Field. 

The NFR returned to the Thomas & Mack Center in Las Vegas in 2021, while the NFBR moved to the Orleans Arena, also in Las Vegas, that same year. 

In 2022, the NFBR moved to Las Vegas’ South Point Arena & Equestrian Center. Unlike the first two NFBRs, which took place on same days as the NFR, the event took place just before the start of the NFR.

Impact on UNLV 
The Thomas & Mack Center is the home court for the UNLV basketball team. By hosting the NFR, the basketball team plays a few of their away games for about 12 days every December while the NFR is in the Thomas & Mack Center.

Television and streaming
The National Finals Rodeo has been televised consistently since 1974. From that year to 1986, the event was telecast through syndication. From 1987 to 2010, it was broadcast by ESPN, although its coverage was often tape delayed due to coverage of other events. From 2011 to 2013, the NFR was broadcast live on Great American Country (GAC). From 2014 to 2019, it was televised on CBS Sports Network. Since 2020, it has been televised live on The Cowboy Channel and RFD-TV, and streamed live on the subscription-based The Cowboy Channel Plus application.

References

External links
 Official site
 National Finals Steer Roping
 NFR at PRCA - ESPN website

Rodeos
Sports competitions in Las Vegas
Recurring sporting events established in 1959